This was the first edition of the tournament.

Guido Andreozzi and Ariel Behar won the title after defeating Martin Kližan and Jozef Kovalík 6–3, 6–4 in the final.

Seeds

Draw

References
 Main Draw

Casino Admiral Trophy - Doubles